Hinsbourg is a commune in the Bas-Rhin department in Grand Est in north-eastern France.

Geography
Hinsbourg is positioned in the north of Alsace, some thirty kilometres (eighteen miles) through twisting mostly wooded roads to the north of Saverne, and within the Palatinate Forest-North Vosges Biosphere Reserve.

Surrounding communes are Puberg to the northeast, Zittersheim to the east, La Petite-Pierre to the southeast, Struth to the southwest and Frohmuhl to the west.

See also
 Communes of the Bas-Rhin department

References

Communes of Bas-Rhin
Bas-Rhin communes articles needing translation from French Wikipedia